Ashiro may refer to:

Ashiro, Iwate, town in Japan
Megu Ashiro (亜城 めぐ) (born 1978), Japanese voice actress

Japanese-language surnames